Steelbath Suicide is the debut studio album by Swedish melodic death metal band Soilwork. It was released on 20 May 1998 through Listenable and Century Media labels. It is the only album to feature guitarist Ludvig Svartz and drummer Jimmy Persson.

The original release has two Japanese bonus tracks, "Disintegrated Skies" and "Burn", a Deep Purple cover. Century Media re-released the album in 2000 with different cover art and a live track of "Sadistic Lullabye".

This album is a firm example of the band's immediate roots in Swedish melodic death metal. The song "Demon in Veins", is a revised version of "Wake Up Call" off their demo; the lyrics changed are in the chorus.

Track listing

Credits 
 Björn "Speed" Strid – vocals
 Peter Wichers – guitar
 Ludvig Svartz – guitar
 Carlos Del Olmo Holmberg – keyboards, synthesizer, programming
 Ola Flink – bass
 Jimmy Persson – drums

Release history

References 

1998 debut albums
Century Media Records albums
Soilwork albums
Albums produced by Fredrik Nordström